Chris Franks (born 27 April 1974) is a Canadian former international soccer player who played professionally in North America and England.

He currently is physiotherapist at Vancouver Whitecaps FC.

Club career
Franks has played professionally for the Vancouver Whitecaps FC and Doncaster Rovers. However, he never made a league appearance for Doncaster.

International career
He made his debut for Canada in a May 1998 friendly match against Macedonia and that game proved to be his only international appearance.

Personal life
He is the older brother of Mike Franks.

References

External links
 
 

1974 births
Living people
Soccer players from Montreal
Canadian soccer players
Association football defenders
UBC Thunderbirds soccer players
Vancouver Whitecaps (1986–2010) players
Doncaster Rovers F.C. players
A-League (1995–2004) players
USL First Division players
Canada men's youth international soccer players
Canada men's under-23 international soccer players
Canada men's international soccer players
Canadian expatriate soccer players
Canadian expatriate sportspeople in England
Expatriate footballers in England
Association football physiotherapists
University of British Columbia alumni
Vancouver Whitecaps FC non-playing staff